Syed Saad Andaleeb is a Bangladeshi-American academic who served as the 3rd Vice-chancellor of BRAC University.

Education and career
Andaleeb obtained his bachelor's in chemical engineering in 1976 and master's in business administration in 1977 from University of New Hampshire. He then earned his Ph.D. in business administration from the University of Illinois at Urbana-Champaign in 1989.

Andaleeb was a distinguished professor of marketing at the Sam and Irene Black School of Business, Pennsylvania State University – Erie, The Behrend College in the United States.

Activities
At the invitation of Philip Kotler, Andaleeb moderated a panel on "Moving to Corporate Social Responsibility as the Next Stage for Company Success" at the World Marketing Summit, which was held in Tokyo from October 13–14, 2015.

References

Living people
Gies College of Business alumni
University of New Hampshire alumni
Pennsylvania State University faculty
Vice-Chancellors of BRAC University
Year of birth missing (living people)
Place of birth missing (living people)